The Latin Bishop of Gibraltar is the ordinary of the Roman Catholic Diocese of Gibraltar, covering the British overseas territory of Gibraltar, which is exempt, i.e. immediately subject to the Holy See, not part of any ecclesiastical province, nor is it part of any (Spanish or British) episcopal conference.
 
The Diocese's episcopal seat (cathedra) is located in the Cathedral of St. Mary the Crowned. The diocese also has a National Shrine of Our Lady of Europe.

The incumbent, the Right Reverend Carmelo Zammit, who was appointed Bishop of Gibraltar on 24 June 2016 and received episcopal ordination on 8 September 2016, was installed there on 24 September 2016.

Lacking independence, the tiny territory (governed as British overseas territory, but claimed by Spain) had no diplomatic relations, so no papal diplomatic representation.

History 
 Established on 25 January 1816 as Apostolic Vicariate of Gibraltar (Gibilterra in Curiate Italian, Latin adjective Gibraltarien(sis)), on territory split off from the Spanish Diocese of Cádiz
 Promoted to the Diocese of Gibraltar on 19 November 1910.

Statistics 
As per 2014 it pastorally served 23,495 Catholics (79.8% of 29,431 total) on 6 km2 in 5 parishes with 8 priests (7 diocesan, 1 religious) and 2 lay religious (1 brother, 1 sister).

Episcopal Catholic Ordinaries

Apostolic Vicars of Gibraltar

Exempt Bishops of Gibraltar

See also 

 List of Catholic dioceses in Spain, Andorra, Ceuta and Gibraltar
 Anglican Bishop in (continental) Europe, with see in Gibraltar

References

Sources and external links 
 GCatholic with Google map & - satellite photo

Gibraltar-related lists